Baigue is one of the most ancient and popular types of horse races with many Turkic people.
Baigue is a rugged terrain riding for long distance (5–15 km in the past more than 50 km) in which a tactical skill of the rider plays the most important role. Its appearance is connected with the nomadic way of life, the necessity of horses’ training for long moves. Nowadays it is held at hippodromes.

Types of baigue

Alaman Baigue
It is a rugged terrain riding for long and extra-long distance up to 50 km. Being the most prestigious and difficult type of baigue Alaman Baigue was the main part of large national festivals and funeral. Contests were held in the steppe on a direct road full of natural hindrances without limits numbers of horses and their breeds. The riders were usually boys of age 14 years old who were already experienced horsemen. Only mature horses of 3 years and upwards can participate in Alaman Baigue. There is no common standard of distance length of the race. In Kazakhstan the distance of 21 and 31 km is usually used. Occasionally races for 50 and 100 km are held.
Only specially prepared racers participate in this type of baiga. Pure-bred horses of rare breeds such as the Thoroughbed, Arabian, Akhal-Teke horses, etc. are excluding from the race (lack of endurance, high price, etc.) .

Kunan Baigue
Kunan Baigue is races of young horses of 2 years of age for 11 km. Horses are ridden by children of 7–8 years of age without saddles. Races are held before Alaman baigue. It is in Kunan Baigue where future qualities of racehorses for more serious contests can be revealed.

Officially in Kazakhstan races are held several times a year at hippodrome “Alaman” in Kokbastau village of Almaty region, hippodrome “Taldykorgan” in Taldycorgan city and at the hippodromes in other districts of Kazakhstan. Informally baigue is organized much more often as the main part of large national festivals, different celebrations, death-anniversaries in any Kazakh village.

Equestrian sports
Horse racing